The Valparaiso Moraine is a recessional moraine (a land form left by receding glaciers) that forms an immense U around the southern Lake Michigan basin in North America. It is the longest moraine. It is a band of hilly terrain composed of glacial till and sand. The Valparaiso Moraine forms part of the Saint Lawrence River Divide, bounding the Great Lakes Basin.  It begins near the border of Wisconsin and Illinois and extends south through Lake, McHenry, Cook, DuPage and Will counties in Illinois, and then turns southeast, going through northwestern Indiana. From this point, the moraine curves northeast through Lake, Porter, and LaPorte counties of Indiana into Michigan. It continues into Michigan as far as Montcalm County. 

The moraine was formed during the Crown Point Phase of the Wisconsin glaciation. At this time the glacier covering the area had grown thin, so it was restrained by dolomite rock layers in the Lake Michigan basin. Where the glacier stopped, glacial till and sand was deposited, creating the hills of the moraine. After the Valparaiso Moraine was formed, the glacier retreated and formed the Tinley Moraine.

Many towns in northwest Indiana and northeast Illinois are named after the Valparaiso Moraine or the Tinley Moraine. The moraine itself was named after the city of Valparaiso, Indiana where the moraine is at its highest and the city lies on the moraine.

As part of the continental divide, many creeks or rivulets have their origin source in the Valparaiso Moraine. Water on one side of the moraine flows into Lake Michigan, through the Great Lakes, and eventually into the Atlantic Ocean via the Saint Lawrence River, while water run-off on the other side of the moraine flows into tributaries of the Mississippi River, which eventually flows into the Gulf of Mexico.  The moraine divide was breached at the Chicago Portage by canal beginning in the 19th century.

History
The Valparaiso Moraine formed as the first major moraine of the Cary substage of the Wisconsin Glacial period (10,000-50,000 years before present). There are three minor moraines that have been identified in northeastern Illinois, the Minooka, Rockdale, and Manhattan. Within the arc created by the Valparaiso Moraine are two younger Cary substage moraines of the Tinley Moraine and the Lake Border Moraine. Younger still is the Port Huron system, which occurs in the northern portion of the Lake Michigan Basin. The Cary substage dates to around 30,000 years before present.

Location
  The Valparaiso system includes five moraines north of Chicago. The most northerly reach is to the headwaters of the Fox River in Waukesha County, west of Milwaukee.  The moraine angles to the south and east, reaching the headwaters of the Des Plaines River west of Kenosha, Wisconsin, in the county of the same name. The moraine forms a major portion of the eastern divide of the Fox River Basin and then the western bank of the Des Plaines River. The moraine continues southward along the Des Plaines River following the route of the modern Tri-State Tollway (I-294) around the west side of Chicago. Where the Des Plaines River bends to the west and forms the Illinois River, the moraine angles south and east, continuing along I-294 towards Chicago Heights. In this area, the moraine has widened out towards the south and east, becoming a broad plain covering large portions of Will and Kankakee counties.

Turning eastward, the moraine enters Indiana. As it passes through Porter County, Indiana, it is under the city of Valparaiso, from which it derives its name. Through Indiana, the moraine forms a "continental divide" between the drainage of the Great Lakes and the Gulf of Mexico by the Mississippi River.

The moraine then turns northeast, passing just north of La Porte, Indiana, through the county of the same name. Upon entering Michigan the moraine forms much of the shoreline of Lake Michigan northward through St. Joseph.

Distribution
It is narrowest in LaPorte County, Indiana and widest in Lake County, Indiana. In northern Illinois the moraines merge into a composite moraine, including parts of earlier stages.. 

The Valparaiso morainic system in Michigan includes the morainic belt along Lake Michigan, from the Grand River Valley south.  In places it consists of two or more ridges. These ridges coalesce and separate repeatedly. In northern Van Buren County it becomes associated with the Saginaw moraine.

Altitude
The highest point is near Lake Zurich, in southern Lake County. The lowest is on the Des Plaines River, in Will County. In Allegan County the moraine has its greatest variation.

Thickness of the drift
The drift across the Valparaiso moraine and outwash plains is the result of repetitive ice advances and intervening recessions.  This drift and the drift from the previous ice sheets of the Illinoian and Iowan glacial periods are present across northeastern Illinois and northwestern Indiana. The early Wisconsin drift are similar to that of the Valparaiso drift that identification of each period is not currently possible.

Preservation
Moraine Nature Preserve is located north of Valparaiso, Indiana, east of State Route 49 and south of US Route 6 on County Road 750 North (Meska Rd).  Indiana Department of Natural Resources maintains .  The preserve has numerous trails through rolling ridges and steep hills left by the glaciers.  The area includes potholes and a shallow pond.   It is covered by a mature beech-maple forest on the high ground and buttonbush and black willow in the ravines, potholes and near the pond.

Correlative moraines
The Lake Erie basin has two moraines of the same age as the Valparaiso Moraine, the Mississinewa Moraine and the Union Moraine. These moraines formed from the Lake Erie Lobe of the continental glacier.[2] In Michigan the Kalamazoo Moraine is of the same time period.  It is the result of the Saginaw lobe of the Laurentian glacier.

See also 
 Terminal moraine
 Geography of Indiana
 List of glacial moraines
 Niagara Escarpment
Glacial features, north to south from Lake Michigan:
 Calumet Shoreline
 Glenwood Shoreline
 Tinley Moraine
 Valparaiso Moraine
 Kankakee Outwash Plain

References

Schoon, Kenneth J., Calumet Beginnings, 2003, Indiana University Press p. 20-22

External links
LakeRim, University of Indiana: Maps and data for the Lake Michigan region in northwest Indiana

Moraines of Indiana
Landforms of Illinois
Lake Michigan
Landforms of Porter County, Indiana
Geological history of the Great Lakes
Landforms of McHenry County, Illinois
Landforms of Cook County, Illinois
Landforms of DuPage County, Illinois
Landforms of Will County, Illinois
Landforms of Lake County, Indiana
Landforms of LaPorte County, Indiana
Landforms of Montcalm County, Michigan
Moraines of the United States